Inter-LGBT (Interassociative Lesbienne, Gaie, Bi et Trans) is an umbrella group of 50 LGBT organisations in France.

Overview
It organises the Printemps des Assoces every April as well as the annual Gay marches. Its headquarters, located in Le Marais, has a library open to the public.

Inter-LGBT is considered to be a lobby by its former spokesman Alain Piriou. It is a member of ILGA-Europe.

References

External links
Official website

LGBT political advocacy groups in France